Capraita nigrosignata, the germander flea beetle, is a species of flea beetle in the family Chrysomelidae. It is found in Central America and North America.

References

Further reading

 
 

Alticini
Articles created by Qbugbot
Beetles described in 1920
Taxa named by Charles Frederic August Schaeffer